Lesotho–United States relations are bilateral relations between the Kingdom of Lesotho and the United States of America.

History 

The United States was one of the first four countries to establish an embassy in Maseru after Lesotho gained its independence from Great Britain in 1966.  Since this time, Lesotho and the United States have consistently maintained positive bilateral relations.  In 1996, the United States closed its bilateral aid program in Lesotho. The Southern African regional office of the U.S. Agency for International Development (USAID) in Gaborone, Botswana now administers most of the U.S. assistance to Lesotho, which totalled approximately $54 million in FY 2016. Total U.S. aid to Lesotho is over $73 million, including humanitarian food assistance. The Peace Corps has operated in Lesotho since 1967. About 100 Peace Corps volunteers concentrate in the sectors of agriculture, health and education. The Government of Lesotho encourages greater American participation in commercial life and welcomes interest from potential U.S. investors and suppliers. In July 2007, the Government of Lesotho signed a compact with the Millennium Challenge Corporation to provide $362.5 million in support to develop Lesotho's water sector, healthcare infrastructure, and private sector. The compact ended in September 2013, with approximately 1 million people expecting to benefit from its investments.

Principal U.S. Officials include:
 Ambassador - Rebecca Gonzales
Deputy Chief of Mission - Daniel Katz

See also 
 Foreign relations of the United States
 Foreign relations of Lesotho
 List of ambassadors of Lesotho to the United States

References

External links
 History of Lesotho - U.S. relations

 
Bilateral relations of the United States
United States